Legion Speer was a Nazi German paramilitary motor transportation corps founded in 1942. The members of the Legion were non-German citizens, and as such could not belong to the Nationalsozialistisches Kraftfahrkorps (NSKK). The legion was disbanded in 1944, and its members absorbed into the Transportkorps Speer. It was named after Albert Speer.

Creation
Legion Speer was founded in 1942, as a corps of drivers and mechanics recruited in occupied Europe. Motor transportation for Organisation Todt (OT) was organized by the NSKK, but non-Germans could not become members, as it was a sub-organization of the Nazi Party. Hence a special corps had to be created.

Personnel
The first members of the Legion were White Russian emigrants. The majority of its members were Soviet POWs serving as Hiwis. They were only allowed to serve in Western Europe. The Legion was open to all citizens of occupied Europe; Belgians, Czech, Norwegians, and others. Command positions were reserved for Germans. Some Germans also served as drivers. The Legionaries took a personal oath of allegiance to Adolf Hitler. A number of Norwegians were members of the Legion; some of them were drafted, but most of them had volunteered.

Organization
The Legion was a motor transportation corps, operating within the framework of the NSKK, in the service of the OT, the Ministry of Armament, the army, and the Luftwaffe. The Legion had Ersatzabteilungen (depots) in Paris, Oslo, Belgrade and Kiev. From 1943 the organization of the Legion corresponded with the organization of the OT:
 Legion Speer Italien, Rome
 Legion Speer Norwegen, Oslo
 Legion Speer Reich, Berlin
Legion Speer Südost, Belgrade
 Legion Speer West, Paris

Disbandment
The Legion was disbanded on September 12, 1944, and its members transferred to Transportkorps Speer.

Ranks

See also
 Transportflotte Speer

References

Notes

Cited literature
 Handbook of the Organisation Todt (1945), London: MIRS. 
 Lepage, Jean Denis G. G. (2015). Hitler’s Armed Forces Auxiliaries. McFarland & Co.
 Seidler, Franz W. (1984), '"Das Nationalsozialistiche Kraftfahrkorps und die Organisation Todt im Zweitem Weltkrieg", Vierteljahrshefte für Zeitgeschichte 32(4): 625-636.
 Thomas, Nigel (1992), Wehrmacht Auxiliary Forces, London 1992.

Organizations established in 1942
Military history of Germany
Economy of Nazi Germany
1942 establishments in Germany